Ensemble, et al. is an indie, classical ensemble percussion quartet based in Brooklyn, New York.  Founded by Ron Tucker, the quartet includes Charles Kessenich, J. Ross Marshall and Jeff Eng.

Discography
When the Tape Runs Out (2011)
Present Point Passed (2014)
The Slow Reveal (2017)
patterns & improvisations, vol. 1 (2018)

References

External links
Official site

Musical groups from Brooklyn
Percussion ensembles